Paul "Bogeyman" Watton (born 6 March 1963) is a former Northern Irish professional darts player, who played in Professional Darts Corporation events.

Career
Watton played in the 2000 World Grand Prix, where he lost to Dennis Smith in the first round.

Watton reached the quarter-finals of the 2001 Winmau World Masters, by beating Wayne Jones of England, Luis Martinez of United States before losing to Richie Burnett of Wales.

Watton also qualified for the 2006 World Grand Prix, however he lost 2–0 in sets in the first round to left hander James Wade.

He quit the PDC in 2007.

References

External links

1963 births
Living people
Darts players from Northern Ireland
Professional Darts Corporation associate players